The Gay Cavalier is a 1946 black and white Western adventure starring Gilbert Roland, Helen Gerald and Tristram Coffin. It is based on a story by the author O. Henry.

Plot 
Roland plays The Cisco Kid, who sets out on a double mission. He must prevent a girl from marrying a wealthy suitor in order to save her family's hacienda, thus forsaking her true love in doing so; and also apprehend the outlaws who robbed a stagecoach carrying gold to a local mission. He eventually finds that the wealthy suitor is behind the gold robbery, a revelation that makes his task much easier.

Cast 
 Gilbert Roland as Cisco Kid
 Martin Garralaga as Don Felipe Geralda
 Nacho Galindo as "Baby"
 Ramsay Ames as Pepita Geralda
 Helen Gerald as Angela Geralda
 Tristram Coffin as Lawton
 Gil Frye as Juan (as Drew Allen)
 Iris Flores as Fisherman's wife
 John Merton as Lewis
 Frank LaRue as Graham

External links 
 The Gay Cavalier at the Internet Movie Database

1946 films
1946 Western (genre) films
Films directed by William Nigh
Monogram Pictures films
American Western (genre) films
American black-and-white films
Adaptations of works by O. Henry
Cisco Kid
1940s American films